The 2015 Netball Superleague season (known for sponsorship reasons as the Zeo Netball Superleague) was the tenth season of the Netball Superleague. The league was won by Surrey Storm after defeating Hertfordshire Mavericks in the grand final. Manchester Thunder finished top of the table following the regular season but they subsequently lost to Mavericks in the semi-finals. Thunder eventually finished third overall. Yorkshire Jets were the surprise team of the season, finishing third during the regular season and fourth overall. This was the first season in Superleague history that Team Bath did not qualify for the semi-finals.

Teams

Regular season
This season saw extra time introduced for drawn matches. If the scores were even after sixty minutes of play, matches were to continue into extra-time, consisting of two seven minute halves. If the sides are still tied following extra-time, the game will continue until a team has moved ahead of the other, by two clear goals.

Results
Round 1

Round 2

Round 3

Round 4

Round 5

Round 6

Round 7

Round 8

Round 9

Round 10

Round 11

Round 12

Round 13

Round 14

Final table
Manchester Thunder finished top of the table following the regular season. Surrey Storm finished second. Yorkshire Jets finished third after winning ten games, six points ahead of fourth placed Hertfordshire Mavericks. This was the first season in Superleague history that Team Bath did not qualify for the semi-finals.

Play-offs

Semi-finals

3rd/4th place play off

Grand Final

Top scorers

See also
 2015 Surrey Storm season

References

 
2015
 
Netball